Peter Smith (born 31 October 1980) is an English former footballer, who played for Exeter City as a midfielder, and is currently assistant manager of Floriana. Peter has also had a spell playing in Finland for Rhiamaki Rips, represented England FA and coached at Liverpool FC Academy.

References

External links

1980 births
Living people
People from Skelmersdale
English footballers
Association football midfielders
Exeter City F.C. players
Cambridge City F.C. players
Bamber Bridge F.C. players
Buckingham Town F.C. players
Caernarfon Town F.C. players
English Football League players